"Give Us a Goal" is a song by the British rock band Slade, released in 1978 as a non-album single. It was written by lead vocalist Noddy Holder and bassist Jim Lea, and produced by Chas Chandler. A football-themed song, it failed to chart on the UK Singles Chart. In 2008, the song was used in a UK TV advert for the football video game Fifa 09.

Background
Having returned to the UK from the United States in 1976, Slade found themselves out-of-favour at the time of the UK's Punk rock explosion. Slade's waning success soon led to the band playing small gigs, including universities and clubs, but despite being successful at filling small venues, their new records were barely selling. Although the band's October 1977 single "My Baby Left Me - That's All Right" had reached the UK Top 40, the successive single "Give Us a Goal", released in February 1978, was one of a string of singles to fail to chart. It had been released to coincide with the band's UK tour during March–April.

Having written the tune, the idea for the lyrics of "Give Us a Goal" came after Holder suggested the band write a song about football as many of the band's fans were also football supporters. For the 1991 video compilation Wall of Hits, Lea recalled: "I wrote this tune and Nod said 'Let's do one about football because we've always had this football following". I was never really convinced about doing a football song, nevertheless the video was fun." The song was recorded in early 1978.

Release
"Give Us a Goal" was released on 7" vinyl by Barn Records in the UK, Ireland, France, Germany and Belgium. It was also released on 12" vinyl in Italy, which was Slade's first release on 12" vinyl. The B-side, "Daddio", was exclusive to the single and would later appear on the band's 2007 compilation B-Sides.

Promotion
In the UK, the band performed the song on the TV shows Cheggers Plays Pop and Get It Together. In Record Mirror, an advertisement for the single featured a cartoon drawing of the band scoring a goal against Lea who appeared as the goalkeeper.

Music video
A music video was filmed to promote the single, which was shot at Brighton & Hove Albion F.C.'s Goldstone Ground in Hove. It featured shots of the band performing the song in front of a crowd, while other sequences showed the band playing football with the Brighton team. The footage of the band performing the song was shot prior to a home match, while the footage of the band playing football had been filmed a couple of days before during a practice match. On the days of filming, it was so cold that guitarist Dave Hill had to wear a hat, while the band could hardly play football in the weather.

The director of the video insisted the film crew keep filming until one of the band members scored a goal against Brighton's goalkeeper. It took a long time for the band to achieve this, with drummer Don Powell scoring the goal. In 1991, Holder recalled: "Alan Mullery was the manager at the time and he was shouting to the team from the sidelines, "Let them have a kick!". I had to take a penalty at one point and could I get the ball in the net? I must have tried ten times and in the end the goalie was rolling on the floor pissing himself laughing."

Critical reception
Upon release, Record Mirror felt the song had "plenty of guts, the typical rasping vocals, all that stuff, but it's missed the goal". In a review of the band's 1978 concert at the Hammersmith Odeon in London, New Musical Express writer David Blake described the "new anthem" as being "of considerable interest to rabid footy fans and of no interest to anyone else."

Track listing
7" Single
 "Give Us a Goal" - 2:49
 "Daddio" - 2:30

12" Single (Italian release)
 "Give Us a Goal" - 2:49
 "Daddio" - 2:30

Personnel
Slade
Noddy Holder - lead vocals, rhythm guitar
Dave Hill - lead guitar, backing vocals
Jim Lea - bass, backing vocals
Don Powell - drums

Additional personnel
Chas Chandler - producer

References

1978 singles
Slade songs
Songs written by Noddy Holder
Songs written by Jim Lea
Song recordings produced by Chas Chandler
British hard rock songs
1978 songs